Ke-Go was one of the first guided weapons, deployed by the Yokosuka Naval Air Technical Arsenal.

Testing three models of the first bombs were made in early 1945. The bombs were dropped on the heat target 10 × 30 meters (the fire burning on the raft). The results were not satisfactory, despite the fact that the homing head worked quite satisfactorily. Only 5 or 6 out of 50 bombs dropped hit the target. Based on these results, the fleet created two new models with improved guidance, but by the time the bombs were ready for testing, the war ended.

See also
 Bat (U.S. Navy radar-guided bomb)
 Fritz X
 Ohka
 Project Pigeon
 Gargoyle
 GB-4
 GB-8
 Kehl-Strasbourg radio control link, for MCLOS control of WW II German PGM ordnance
 List of anti-ship missiles
 List of World War II guided missiles of Germany
 Kramer X4- Max Kramer's air-to-air guided missile
 Funryu
 Kawasaki Ki-147 I-Go Type1 – Ko
 Kawasaki Ki-148
 Nikitin PSN-1
 Nikitin PSN-2

References

External links
 

World War II guided missiles
World War II aerial bombs of Japan
Guided bombs